Firebird is a 2021 romantic war drama film directed, co-written, and co-produced by Peeter Rebane (in his feature directorial debut), based on Sergey Fetisov's memoir The Story of Roman. The film stars Tom Prior (who also co-wrote and co-produced), Oleg Zagorodnii, and Diana Pozharskaya. Set in the Soviet Air Force during the Cold War, it tells the true story of forbidden love between a private and a fighter pilot.

Firebird had its world premiere at the 35th BFI Flare: London LGBTIQ+ Film Festival on 17 March 2021. The film also screened at the 45th Frameline: San Francisco International LGBTQ+ Film Festival on 27 June 2021, where it won an honorable mention for Best First Feature. The film was  released in cinemas internationally by Roadside Attractions on 29 April 2022.

Plot
Sergey, a young private in the Soviet Air Force, has only a few weeks remaining in his military service. He and his friends bristle under the tight control of the military commanders. He appears to have a budding romance with Luisa, the secretary to the base commander, and he indulges in a photography hobby that is barely tolerated by his superiors. He is assigned to assist a new fighter pilot, Roman, when he arrives. An undeniable passion between them develops, despite the threat of imprisonment that hangs over homosexual romances under the Soviet regime. Nonetheless, they consummate their attraction to one another and are nearly found out by a KGB agent.

Roman encourages Sergey to study acting in Moscow instead of returning to his family's farm when he leaves the service. A year after Sergey leaves and finds a new life in the theater, he is invited to Roman and Luisa's wedding. He attends and barely contains his disappointment in Roman and continuing love for him.

Roman and Luisa have a child together, but their marriage is a sham, and he continues to yearn for Sergey. Roman leaves his wife and son ostensibly to study in Moscow. He secretly rents an apartment with Sergey and they cohabit happily and take vacations together. However, Luisa and their son come to Moscow for Christmas and Roman and Sergey's love is revealed to her. She is enraged at both Roman and Sergey by this revelation and the two men must part.

Later, Roman is assigned to participate in the Soviet–Afghan War, where he is killed. After his death, Sergey visits Luisa, who is still very angry at him. He returns to his life as an actor in Moscow and is last seen watching a production of Igor Stravinsky's ballet, The Firebird, which Roman had introduced him to.

Cast
 Tom Prior as Sergey Serebrennikov
 Oleg Zagorodnii as Roman Matvejev
 Diana Pozharskaya as Luisa
 Jake Thomas Henderson as Volodja
 Margus Prangel as Major Zverev
 Nicholas Woodeson as Colonel Kuznetsov
 Ester Kuntu as Masha
 Kaspar Velberg as Pilot Selenov
 Sergei Lavrentev as Drama Professor
 Rasmus Kaljujärv as Pilot
 Lauri Mäesepp as Pilot
 Karl-Andreas Kalmet as Pilot
 Vladimir Nadein as Young Conscript
 Markus Luik as Sergeant Janis

Production 
Peeter Rebane first came across the story of Firebird in 2014 when Sergei Lavrentiev, film critic and actor, gave him a copy of The Story of Roman by Sergey Fetisov. Rebane collaborated with actor and screenwriter Tom Prior, who was previously in The Theory of Everything and Kingsman: The Secret Service. Rebane and Prior interviewed Fetisov before his death in 2017 to gain materials for the film's production.

Casting 
Prior was first approached to play Sergey Serebrennikov before becoming involved in the writing process.  Oleg Zagorodnii, a Ukrainian actor, was then cast to play the role of Roman Matvejev. Zagorodnii, who's been in a couple of Russian stage productions, was hesitant about taking on the role, citing his limited English.

While in Moscow, Rebane came across Diana Pozharskaya, a Russian actress and dancer, whom he believed had the right energy to play the part. "Ninety percent of a director’s job is casting," said Rebane. "If you cast the right personality, with the right energy for the role you are off to a good start."

Release 
The film had its world premiere at the 35th BFI Flare: London LGBTIQ+ Film Festival on 17 March 2021, screening as part of the Hearts strand. It also screened at the 43rd Moscow International Film Festival on 24 April 2021, the 45th Frameline: San Francisco International LGBTQ+ Film Festival on 27 June 2021, the 42nd Durban International Film Festival on 23 July 2021,and the 39th Outfest Los Angeles LGBTQ Film Festival on 21 August 2021. Its Asian premiere was held at the 32nd Hong Kong Lesbian & Gay Film Festival on 17 September 2021. On 22 February 2022, it was announced that the director Peeter Rebane had granted the film's distribution rights to Roadside Attractions, which was set to release it to cinemas on 29 April 2022.

Reception

On the review aggregator website Rotten Tomatoes, which categorizes reviews only as positive or negative, 55% of 49 reviews are positive, with an average rating of 5.60. On Metacritic, the film has a weighted average score of 49 out of 100, based on 11 critics, indicating "mixed or average reviews". Randy Myers in his review for the San Jose Mercury News said it is "a glossy and classy melodrama that soars with passion and is elevated by strong production values, heartfelt performances and a story arc that journeys to unexpected destinations". In the Daily Mirror (UK), Lewis Knight said that it "is not a revolutionary Queer romance by any means but it is a glossy love story with conviction and genuine historical tragedy."

In less favorable reviews, Ed Gonzalez wrote for Slant Magazine that the movie is suffocated by "clichés and then there are only clichés". Mark Keizer of The A.V. Club gave the movie a "C", praising the lead actors' chemistry and beauty but found its melodramatic screenplay does the film "no favor".

References

External links
 
 

2021 films
2021 directorial debut films
2021 LGBT-related films
2021 romantic drama films
2020s historical drama films
2021 war drama films
British films based on actual events
British historical drama films
British historical romance films
British LGBT-related films
British romantic drama films
British war drama films
Cold War films
Drama films based on actual events
English-language Estonian films
Estonian war drama films
Films about air forces
Films about friendship
Films based on memoirs
Films set in 1977
Films set in Estonia
Films shot in Estonia
Films shot in Malta
Films shot in Russia
Gay-related films
LGBT-related romantic drama films
War films based on actual events
War romance films
2020s English-language films
2020s British films